Prairie Center may refer to:

Prairie Center, Illinois, an unincorporated community in LaSalle County
Prairie Center, Nebraska, an unincorporated community in Buffalo County